Isabelle Ferreras (born 21 August 1975) is a Belgian sociologist and a political scientist. She is a professor of sociology at the University of Louvain (Louvain-la-Neuve, Belgium) where is affiliated with the Centre de recherches interdisciplinaires Démocratie, Institutions, Subjectivité. She is also a senior research associate at the Labor and Work life Program at Harvard Law School. Furthermore, Ferreras is a tenured fellow of the Belgian National Science Foundation (F.N.R.S., Brussels). Since the spring of 2017 she has been a member of the group called Classe Technologie et Société in the Royal Academy of Sciences, Humanities and the Arts of Belgium where she in 2021 and 2022 holds the position as president of the academy as well as the chairman of her group.

Ferreras works in political sociology, sociology of economics, and political theory. She is interested in topics such as worker's experiences, democratic equality in capitalist societies, corporate governance, labor-manager relations, unions, and the labor market. In 2017 Ferreras published a book called "Firms as Political Entities – Saving Democracy through Economic Bicameralism" which received wide attention in the academic field. She is also a co-founder of the #DemocratizingWork movement and a co-author of its manifesto.

Background and education 
In 2004 Ferreras obtained a PhD in Sociology from the University of Louvain as well as a MSc in Political Science from Massachusetts Institute of Technology. In 2000, Ferreras was a visiting scholar at University of Wisconsin-Madison. In 2005 she graduated from the Harvard Trade Union Program.

Work 
Ferreras' interests lies in the field of tension between the state, businesses, and workers' in a globalised world and especially governance of firms and workplace democracy. She has developed what she has labeled a "critical political sociology of work" and her work centers around what she calls the "capitalism/democracy contradiction".

In 2016, Ferreras and Hélène Landemore published a paper where they argue that businesses can be seen as analogous to states. They claim that firms should be governed democratically due to the organisational similarities. Ferreras and Landemore advocate for the need of further development of a political theory of the firm. Furthermore, Ferreras has conducted several empirical case studies of workers in collaboration with different academic colleagues. Together with Jean De Munck she has examined the voice of workers in restructuring processes in a Volkswagen plant in Brussels. In another qualitative case study Ferras has examined a Freelancers' cooperative called SMart-Belgium as a case of "democratic institutional experimentation for better work" along with Julien Charles and Auriane Lamine.

Firms as political entities 
In her book Firms as Political Entities: Saving Democracy through Economic Bicameralism (2017), Ferreras presents her theory of democratic corporate governance. She claims that firms should be recognised as political entities and that firms are the institution in democratic societies that best embody the tension of between capitalism and democracy. Firms rule the global economy but are governed by capital inverstors. When taking managerial decisions investere do not only determine the future of the company but also the worker's future, and the future of the community in which the company exists. Ferreras proposes to democratise firms to make them fit the context of democratic societies by implementing economic bicameralism in companies. The book consists of three main parts:

Part 1 – Critical history of power in the firm: The slow transition of work from the private to the public sphere 
In this part, Ferreras explains how there has been as historical transformation of work in our culture from being private to public. Work is no longer in the private sphere and affected by feudal and household norms and later the factories. Thus, originally, work was built around the relationship between the worker and physical objects and the machines to produce objects. Today, work is a part of the public, democratic sphere and is especially characterized by service work. Since this form of work is about the relationship between workers and costumers work becomes inherently political. Also, industrial firms have introduced a democratic structure of bargaining and decision making between employees and workers.

Part 2 – What is a firm? 
Ferreras argues that firms are more than legal constructs. She claims that firms should also be seen as political entities since they involves work and work relations between the employees which extend beyond being just legal relations. However, firms are still considered private which enables systems of hierarchy and domination to exist in the public. Ferreras argues that the private rule of the capital investors is illegitimate.

Ferreras argues that two types of rationalities exist in a firm. The term "instrumental rationality" labels the set of norms of firms' activities that produce external good such as financial returns for capital investors. Another example of instrumental rationality is when the worker sees her activities as means to getting her pay check. The other form of rationality that characterize a set of norms in a firm is "expressive rationality" in the sense that the worker expresses her essential self. This is when the worker becomes attached to the firm, e.g. forms friendships with other workers and becomes attached to the firms' tradition. It is when the worker is truly engaged in her work and not only sees work as means to an end. Work related to expressive rationality is characterized by a moral, ethical, and political ideals. The two forms of rationality compete with each other and Ferreras' proposed bicameral system can provide a balance between the instrumental and expressive rationality.

Part 3 – Looking to the future: From political bicameralism to economic bicameralism 
Ferreras proposes to organize firms in a bicameral system of corporate governance inspired by bicameral political legislatures. The idea is that this organization of firms should grant the workers of a company the same rights as the capital investors. Both capital investors and the workers are essentially "investors" in a firm, although in different ways, and should therefore have an equal say. The governance of firms should include two operational representative bodies, one for capitalist inventors and one for the workers of the firm. Major decisions of the firm should be passed with a Majority of votes in each body. In this way, the shareholder's councils and worker's councils have to agree and adopt the same strategic texts and decisions. Both bodies have veto power which means that they have to build compromises and the rule of firms can become legitimate.

Academic inspirations and approach 
In her academic work Ferreras is influenced and inspired by Jürgen Habermas, Jean-Mar Ferry, Amartya Sen, Jean-Phillippe Robé, Joel Rorger and Jon Elster.

Ferreras sees herself as a critical scientist and is inspired by Jürgen Habermas' idea of the critical social scientist whose work is moved by the knowledge constitutive interest to emancipate mankind (Knowledge and Human Interest). She wants to help citizens better understand their situation in the specific moment in history they live, to "contribute to their capacity to seek autonomy at a collective and individual level," and affect their own future. Methodologically she works hermeneutically to "identify social actor's critical intuitions about the situations they face".

The #Democratizingwork movement 
In May 2020, Isabelle Ferreras, Julie Battilana and Dominique Méda initiated a global initiative for democratising work and workplaces. They call attention to how the COVID-19 pandemic has highlighted what they see as "cracks and vulnerabilities" of our economy and political system. Specifically, the poor working conditions of the workers who kept societies running throughout the COVID-19 crisis involved both mental and physical risks. The authors point out that the workers usually are "members of radicalized communities, migrants and informal economy workers" which they term "essential workers". The authors call for a "democratisation of firms" and that workers should be given a voice and be a part of the governing of a firm and that their wages should be increased. Furthermore, Ferreras, Battilana and Méda argue that the lives of working humans should not only be governed by market forces and capital investors. They call for a "decommodification of work" and claim humans are not just resources or commodities that instrumentally provide a service for an employer. On the contrary, people invest themselves and engage in their jobs, which Ferreras calls "labor investment". The three scholars have summarised their message in a "working manifesto" which is published in the book Le Manifeste Travail – Démocratiser, Démarchandiser, Dépolluer. Shortly after announcing the initiative publicly as a press release in 36 countries, additional five female scholars backed the project to created awareness in the academic community across different disciplines. These are Julia Cagé, Lisa Herzog, Sara Lafuente Hernandez, Hélène Landemore and Pavlina Tcherneva.

The initiative has gotten wide attention both in the global media and among academic scholars. As of May 2021 more than 6,700 individuals have signed the initiative.

Books

Books in English 
 Jean De Munck, Claude Didry, Isabelle Ferreras and Anette Jobert (eds.), Renewing Democratic Deliberation in Europe. The Challenge of Social and Civil Dialogue, Bruxelles, Bern, Berlin, Frankfurt am Main, New York, Oxford, Wien: Peter Land Press, 2012. 
 Isabelle Ferreras, Firms as Political Entities: Saving Democracy through Economic Bicameralism, New York: Cambridge University Press, 2017.

Books in French 
 Isabelle Ferreras, Critique politique du Travail. Travailler à l'heure de la société des services, Paris: Les Presses de Sciences Po, 2007. 
 Isabelle Ferreras, Gouverner le capitalisme? Pour le bicamérisme économique, Paris: Presses Universitaires de France – PUF, 2012. 
 Isabelle Ferreras, Julie Battilana, and Dominique Méda, Le Manifeste Travail -Démocratiser, démarchandiser, dépolluer. Paris: Seul, 2020. ISBN 978-2021470499

References

External links 
 

Massachusetts Institute of Technology alumni
Université catholique de Louvain alumni
Academic staff of the Université catholique de Louvain
Nationality missing
Women sociologists
Women political scientists
Living people
1975 births